Australia is an album by Howie Day, first released in 2000 independently and re-released in 2002 by Epic Records.

Track listing
All songs written by Howie Day.
 "Sorry So Sorry" – 4:34
 "She Says" – 4:34
 "Secret" – 3:46
 "Slow Down" – 3:40
 "Ghost" – 5:26
 "Kristina" – 5:11
 "Everything Else" – 3:21
 "More You Understand" – 4:52
 "Morning After" – 3:37
 "Disco" – 3:48
 Untitled (Hidden track)1 –  1:32

1 Removed from the re-release by Epic Records

Personnel
 Howie Day – guitar, keyboard, vocals
 Josh Lattanzi – bass
 Steve Scully – percussion, drums
  Ed Valauskas – bass on "Everything Else"
  Dave Wanamaker – guitar, vocals

Record charts

References

2000 albums
Howie Day albums